Microchirita lavandulacea, called the lavender microchirita, is a species of flowering plant in the genus Microchirita, native to southern Vietnam. It has gained the Royal Horticultural Society's Award of Garden Merit.

References

Didymocarpoideae
Endemic flora of Vietnam
Plants described in 2011